A skunk is an animal. 

Skunk may also refer to:

Geography
 Skunk Creek (Gooseberry River), Minnesota
 Skunk Creek (Peruque Creek), Missouri
 Skunk Creek (South Dakota)
 Skunk River (Platte River), Minnesota
 Skunk River, Iowa, a tributary of the Mississippi

Arts, entertainment, and media

Music
 Skunk (band), a band formed in 1986 by musician Matt Sweeney
 Skunk Anansie, a British rock band formed in 1994
 Skunk Records, a California-based record label from 1990 to 2006

Other arts, entertainment, and media
 KUNK, an American radio station branded "The Skunk FM"
 Skunk (community), a Swedish social networking website

Other uses
 Skunk 11, a Canadian sailboat design of the 1960s
 Skunk (Cannabis strain)
 Skunk clownfish (disambiguation), several species of anemonefish that have a white stripe from nose to tail
 Skunk (weapon), a malodorant used by the Israeli Defense Forces to disperse disorderly crowds
 Skunk rule, another name for the Mercy rule in sports
 In cribbage, a player losing by more than 30 points is 'skunked'
 Skunk Train, a popular nickname for the California Western Railroad
 Skunk, nickname of Jeff Baxter, American musician and defense consultant

See also
 SCO Skunkware, a collection of open source software projects
 Skunked beer, beer that has been exposed to ultraviolet light, like sunlight, too long
 Skunked term, a word or phrase that has become ambiguous, thus difficult to use
 Skunkworks (disambiguation)